HTCC may refer to:
 Hong Kong Touring Car Championship
 High temperature co-fired ceramic